Oluwatobi Wande Ojosipe (born 18 October 1985), popularly known as Wande Coal, is a Nigerian singer and songwriter.

Early life 
Wande Coal was born on 18 October 1985 in Lagos Island, Lagos state, Nigeria, to Chief Ibukun Olufunto and Omolara Oluwayemisi Ojosipe. The first of two children,

Education 
Wande Coal began his primary school education at Staff Nursery and Primary School Ijanikin Lagos State , and later proceeded to Federal Government College ijanikin Lagos in Lagos State for his secondary school education. And went on to University of Lagos (Unilag), Lagos State, where he studied Human Kinetics.

Career
Wande coal started singing in the teenage choir at his church. He got his first break in the Nigerian entertainment industry as a dancer. He got signed to Don Jazzy's Mo' Hits Records in 2006. He featured on D'banj's Rundown/Funk you up album on singles such as "Loke", "tonosibe" and "why me".
Being signed to Mo' Hits records, he is also a member of the Mo' Hits allstars and played a major role in the released CV (Curriculum Vitae) album. His first single of the CV album, "Ololufe", has been described as one of the greatest love songs ever written by a Nigerian. Coal later released his debut album Mushin To Mo’Hits which was widely received across Nigeria, UK and the USA.

Coal has also recorded tracks with other Nigerian artists including Ikechukwu, Phyno, Davido, Naeto C, Dr SID, D'Prince, Wizkid and many other artists. In 2012 following a fallout between record label Executives Don Jazzy and D'banj, Coal, Dr SID and D'Prince signed on to Don Jazzy's new Record Label Mavin Records with the addition of Tiwa Savage from 323 entertainment acting as the first lady of mavin records. Wande Coal left Mavin Records on November 7, 2013 due to intellectual property theft of a song with the same lyrics being the same as Don Jazzy's lyrics. In November 2013, he released a single called "Baby Face" as the song that he got departed from Mavin Records for. from..

After a long hiatus, Wande Coal dropped his second album Wanted. Most reviews of the album placed him on a slightly above average scale. Coal recently released a new single Turkey Nla in December 2017.

He kicked of his 2020 with a single track tittled "Again", produced by Melvitto. He just released another Single in 2021 titled "Come My Way".

Discography

Studio albums 
 2009: Mushin To Mo’Hits
 2015: Wanted
 2020: Realms

Compilation albums
  Curriculum Vitae (2007)
 Solar Plexus (2012)

Singles

As featured artist
 P-Lola – "For You"
 Ikechukwu – Like Yo
 Naeto C – Ashawo
 Naeto C – One For Me
 Wizkid – "For Me"
 R2Bees – "Kiss Your Hand"
 D'banj – Celebrate
 D'Prince – "Ooze"
 D'Prince – "I Like What I See"
 Patoranking - "My Woman"
 Shizzi - "Kosowo"
 Falz  – "Way"
 Phyno - "Zamo Zamo"

Selected videography

Awards
 African Artiste of the Year – Ghana Music Awards 2010
 Artiste of the Year – 2010 Hip Hop World Awards
 Best R&b/Pop Single – 2010 Hip Hop World Awards

References

External links 
 Official Website
 "Again" by Wande Coal

Nigerian male pop singers
Living people
1985 births
Nigerian hip hop singers
Yoruba musicians
Musicians from Lagos
People from Ogun State
Nigerian male singer-songwriters
The Headies winners
University of Lagos alumni
English-language singers from Nigeria
Yoruba-language singers
21st-century Nigerian male singers